Patrick Bezerra do Nascimento (born 29 July 1992), simply known as Patrick, is a Brazilian professional footballer who plays  as a midfielder for Atlético Mineiro.

Club career
Born in Rio de Janeiro, Patrick was rejected as a youth by hometown sides Flamengo, Vasco da Gama and Botafogo before becoming a youth graduate of Operário Ferroviário. He made his first team debut for the latter on 27 August 2011, coming on as a second-half substitute for Zé Leandro in a 1–0 Série D away win over Oeste.

Patrick scored his first senior goal on 10 March 2013, netting the equalizer in a 1–1 Campeonato Paranaense away draw against Coritiba. In May of that year, he was loaned to Marcílio Dias, and joined Caxias in September also in a temporary deal.

On 5 December 2013, Patrick was presented at Comercial de Ribeirão Preto, with his former team Operário stating that the transfer was illegal as the player had contract with them until December 2014. He nonetheless played the 2014 Campeonato Paulista for Comercial before joining Turkish Süper Lig side Gaziantepspor on 3 August 2014.

Patrick failed to play a single minute abroad, and returned to Brazil on 5 January 2015, signing a contract with former side Caxias. On 14 May, he was presented at Série A side Goiás.

Patrick made his top tier debut on 16 May 2015, starting in a 2–0 home win over Atlético Paranaense. He featured in 31 league matches during the campaign, as his side suffered relegation.

On 3 June 2017, after winning two Campeonato Goiano titles in a row, Patrick left Goiás and joined Sport Recife in the main category. He scored his first goal in the division on 20 July, netting the opener of a 4–0 home routing of Atlético Goianiense.

On 29 December 2017, Patrick signed a two-year deal with Internacional. On 12 March 2019, the club bought 50% of his economic rights (which belonged to a group of businessman and were assigned at Monte Azul), and he renewed his contract until 2021. On 18 June 2021, he renewed his contract with Inter until June 2023.

On 8 January 2022, Patrick joined São Paulo FC on a two-year deal. He made 55 appearances, scored nine goals and assisted eight others in the 2022 season.

On 19 January 2023, Patrick signed a three-year contract with Atlético Mineiro.

Career statistics

Honours
Marcílio Dias
Campeonato Catarinense Divisão Especial: 2013

Goiás
Campeonato Goiano: 2016, 2017

References

External links

1992 births
Living people
Footballers from Rio de Janeiro (city)
Brazilian footballers
Association football midfielders
Campeonato Brasileiro Série A players
Campeonato Brasileiro Série B players
Campeonato Brasileiro Série C players
Campeonato Brasileiro Série D players
Operário Ferroviário Esporte Clube players
Clube Náutico Marcílio Dias players
Sociedade Esportiva e Recreativa Caxias do Sul players
Comercial Futebol Clube (Ribeirão Preto) players
Gaziantepspor footballers
Atlético Monte Azul players
Goiás Esporte Clube players
Sport Club do Recife players
Sport Club Internacional players
São Paulo FC players
Clube Atlético Mineiro players
Brazilian expatriate footballers
Brazilian expatriate sportspeople in Turkey
Expatriate footballers in Turkey